Richard Eckersley may refer to:

 Richard Eckersley (designer), graphic designer
 Richard Eckersley (footballer), English footballer